Ameghino Gully is a gully running east–west through the outcrops on the west side of Longing Peninsula, Nordenskjold Coast, Antarctica. The name derives from Refugio Ameghino, the Argentine refuge situated on the southwest side of Longing Gap and named in turn after Florentino Ameghino, Argentine geologist and anthropologist. Named by the United Kingdom Antarctic Place-Names Committee in 1990.

References
 

Valleys of Graham Land
Nordenskjöld Coast